Lieutenant General Baron Albert Aquila Alexis Maria du Roy de Blicquy (June 12, 1869 - September 9, 1940) was a Belgian General.

Family 
He was born in the Noble house of du Roy, from French aristocracy. He is the son of Fernand du Roy de Blicquy (1836-1913) and Leontine d'Hanins de Moerkerke (1843-1918), he married the Vicomtesse de Beughem.

Career 
He made a career at the Belgian royal Court and was Aide-de-camp to the Count of Flanders between 1898-1900. Later he became chief of the Military household of the King. As Ordenance Officer to King Albert he was always around the king. A portrait of him was painted by Herbert Arnould Olivier in February 1915.

Honours and awards
 : 
 War Cross.
 Honorary Aide-de-camp of Their Majesties, King Albert and King Leopold.
 Knight Grand Cross in the Order of the Crown.
 Grand Officer in the Order of Leopold.
 : Knight Grand Cross in the Order of the Crown.
 : Knight Grand Cross in the Order of Aviz.
 : Knight Grand Cross in the Most Exalted Order of the White Elephant.

References

1869 births
1940 deaths
Belgian Army generals of World War I
Barons of Belgium
Grand Crosses of the Order of the Crown (Belgium)
Grand Crosses of the Order of Aviz